The Outlaws were an English instrumental band that recorded in the early 1960s. One-time members included Chas Hodges, (born Charles Nicholas Hodges in 1943), Bobby Graham (born Robert Francis Neate in 1940), Ritchie Blackmore (born Richard Hugh Blackmore in 1945), Mick Underwood (born Michael John Underwood in 1945), Reg Hawkins (born Reginald Hawkins in 1942), Billy Kuy (born William John Kuy Jnr. in 1940), Don Groom (born Donald Groom in 1939), Roger Mingaye (born in 1942), Ken Lundgren and Harvey Hinsley.

Their name was originally conceived by Joe Meek (born Robert George Meek in 1929), who needed a backing group for Mike Berry's "Set Me Free" in 1960, after, according to Meek biographer, John Repsch, Meek had fired Berry's original backing group, The Statesmen. After that recording, they continued being one of the house bands of his recording studio at 304 Holloway Road, London. As such, they were used for recordings, demos and auditions. Many of their songs were written by Meek, and credited to  one or other of his pseudonyms, either Robert Duke or Peter Jacobs; the latter of which he used on The Outlaws' "Shake with Me".

They appeared as themselves in the 1963 British film, Live It Up!.

In addition to featuring as a backing band on recordings by Mike Berry (born Michael Hubert Bourne in 1942), including three hit singles, or backing Houston Wells, Gene Vincent, John Leyton, Geoff Goddard or Heinz, they also recorded singles in their own right. One of these, "Bike Beat", for Raleigh Bicycle Company, (see below), even had dance instructions created especially for it, printed on the picture sleeve, with bicycle references : "Grab a girl at random, make like a tandem".

In 1990, all of their 1960s singles were issued on The Outlaws Ride Again (the Singles A's and B's ), on the See For Miles Label.

Discography

Singles
With the line-up : Billy Kuy, Bobby Graham, Chas Hodges, Reg Hawkins
"Swingin' Low" b/w "Spring is Near" (March 1961) - UK No. 46
"Ambush" b/w "Indian Brave" (June 1961) - UK No. 43
"Valley of the Sioux" b/w "Crazy Drums" (September 1961)

With the line-up : Ken Lundgren, Don Groom, Chas Hodges, Roger Mingaye
"Ku-Pow!" b/w "Last Stage West" (February 1962)
"Sioux Serenade" b/w "Fort Knox" (12 October 1962)

With the line-up : Mick Underwood, Ken Lundgren, Chas Hodges, Ritchie Blackmore
"Poppin' Medley Part 1". b/w "Poppin' Medley Part 2". Released  as The Chaps (7 December 1962) Parlophone R4979
"Return of The Outlaws" b/w "Texan Spiritual" (February 1963)
"That Set the Wild West Free" b/w "Hobo" (August 1963) Note : Underwood does not appear on "Hobo"
"Law and Order" b/w "Do Da Day" (December 1963)
"Keep a Knockin'" b/w "Shake with Me" (3 April 1964). Note : John Peel credits "Shake with Me" as the first Heavy Metal recording, according to the liner notes of the CD 'The Outlaws Ride Again (Singles A's and B's)'
"The Bike Beat 1" b/w "The Bike Beat 2" as The Rally Rounders (1964) Lyntone LYN 573 : Flexidisc (for Raleigh Bicycle Company)

With the line-up : Mick Underwood, Ken Lundgren, Chas Hodges, Harvey Hinsley 
"Don't Cry" b/w "Only for You" (February 1965). Note: United States only, vocal single, produced by Derek Lawrence. The b-side to this release features Mick Underwood, Chas Hodges, Ritchie Blackmore and Nicky Hopkins.

Album
With the line-up : Billy Kuy, Bobby Graham, Chas Hodges, Reg Hawkins
Dream of the West (1961): 
"Dream Of The West" / "The Outlaws" / "Husky Team" / "Rodeo" / "Smoke Signals" / "Ambush" / "Barbecue" / "Spring Is Near" / "Indian Brave" / "Homeward Bound" / "Western Sunset" / "Tune For Short Cowboys" (HMV, December 1961). Re-released on CD with bonus tracks : "Swingin' Low" / "Valley Of The Sioux" / "Crazy Drums" (2012, Coronet)

Compilations
Rockin' Guitar - Rare Items Vol.6 :
"Swingin' Low" / "Valley Of The Sioux" / "Crazy Drums" / "Ku-Pow" / "Last Stage West" / "Sioux Serenade" / "Fort Knox" / "Return Of The Outlaws" / " Texan Spiritual" / "That Set The Wild West Free" / "Hobo" / "Law And Order" / "Do Da Day" (1985, Gibson)

Ride Again - The Singles As & Bs : 
"Swingin' Low" / "Spring Is Near" / "Ambush" / "Indian Brave" / "Valley of the Sioux" / "Crazy Drums" / "Last Stage West" / "Ku-Pow" / "Sioux Serenade" / "Fort Knox" / "The Return of the Outlaws" / "Texan Spiritual" / "That Set the Wild West Free" / "Hobo" / "Law and Order" / "Do-Da-Day" / "Keep a Knockin'" / "Shake with Me" (1990, See For Miles Records)

Back To The West :
"Swingin' Low" / "Spring Is Near" / "Ambush" / "Indian Brave" / "Dream Of The West" / "The Outlaws" / "Husky Team" / "Rodeo" / "Smoke Signals" / "Barbecue" / "Homeward Bound" / "Western Sunset" / "Tune For Short Cowboys" / "Valley Of The Sioux" / "Crazy Drums" / "Last Stage West" / "Ku-Pow" / "Sioux Serenade" / "Fort Knox" / "The Return Of The Outlaws" / "Texan Spiritual" / "That Set The Wild West Free" / "Hobo" / "Law And Order" / "Do-Da-Day" / "Keep A Knockin'" / "Shake With Me" (2003, Prospector) Re-released with bonus tracks : The Chaps : "Poppin' [Part 1]" / "Poppin' [Part 2]" / The Raleigh Rounders : "Bike Beat [Part 1]" / "Bike Beat [Part 2]" / The Lancastrians : "Satan's Holiday" / "Earthshaker" (2007, Norf*k Coast Records)

The Best Of The Outlaws :
"Ambush" / "Swingin' Low" / "Valley Of The Sioux" / "Indian Brave" / "Rodeo" / "Barbecue" / "Husky Team" / "Homeward Bound" / "The Outlaws" / "Fort Knox" / "Crazy Drums" / "Sioux Serenade" / "Last Stage West" / "Western Sunset" / "Ku-Pow!" / "Dream Of The West" / "Smoke Signals" / "Spring Is Near" / "Tune For Short Cowboys" / The Chaps : "Poppin' [Part 1]" / "Poppin' [Part 2]" + 7 songs as backing band for Mike Berry (2020, Not Now Music)

References

External links
blackmoresnight.com/ - The Outlaws
Mick Underwood

English rock music groups
English pop music groups
Musical groups established in 1960
Musical groups disestablished in 1965
English session musicians
Beat groups
1960 establishments in England
1965 disestablishments in England
British instrumental musical groups